Efrat Dor (born 6 January 1983) is an Israeli actress. She is best known for portraying Magdalena Gross in the film The Zookeeper’s Wife, as Lizzie DeLaurentis in the Amazon show Sneaky Pete, and as Eva McCulloch in The Flash.

Early life
Dor was born in Be'er Sheva, Israel, to a family of Aschkenazi Polish-Jewish descent. She grew up in its neighboring affluent town of Omer with her parents, a writer and an engineer, and three brothers. Her Polish-Jewish grandmother's mother, father, and his brother were all murdered by the Germans during the Holocaust.

Dor attended Eshel Ha'Nasi high school where she studied drama. She also trained as a ballet dancer at the Bat-Dor Beer-Sheva professional dance school in Beersheba. She went on to study acting at the Beit Zvi School for the Performing Arts in Israel and Lee Strasberg Theatre and Film Institute in New York.

Career

Dor began her professional acting career in 2007 with small roles in Israeli television. She made her feature film debut in 2009 in the Israeli film Phobidilia which featured in the Berlin International Film Festival that same year. She first gained recognition in Israel in 2010 for her role as Shir Ambar in the TV drama Asfur. In 2012, she was nominated for Best Actress in a Drama Series at the Awards of the Israeli Television Academy for the role of police recruit Alex Yudayov in Achat Efes Efes. In 2017, she attracted attention for her depiction of the Polish sculptor Magdalena Gross in the Niki Caro film The Zookeeper’s Wife alongside Jessica Chastain. In 2018, Dor starred in the English-language French film Holy Lands. In 2019, she won acclaim for her portrayal of con artist Lizzie DeLaurentis in the third season of Amazon's hit show Sneaky Pete. Later that year, she was cast in the regular role of Eva McCulloch in the latter half of season six of The Flash.

Filmography

Film

Television

References

External links

1983 births
Living people
Actors from Beersheba
Beit Zvi School for the Performing Arts alumni
Israeli film actresses
Israeli television actresses
Israeli Ashkenazi Jews
Israeli people of Polish-Jewish descent
21st-century Israeli actresses